Stony Brook is a tributary of Green Brook in central New Jersey in the United States.

Course
It flows southeast, crossing Stirling Road, before turning southwest. It then turns northeast and flows into Watchung Lake. In Watchung Lake, it joins an unnamed tributary from the northeast and another one from the southwest. It then leaves the lake and goes southeast through the town of Watchung. It passes through the Stony Brook Gorge in the first Watchung Mountain and over the Wetumpka Falls.

It crosses Route 22 and joins the Crab Brook. It then crosses Greenbrook Road and turns south.

Tributaries
Crab Brook is the only tributary.

See also
Stony Brook (Millstone River)
List of rivers of New Jersey

References

External links
U.S. Geological Survey: NJ stream gaging stations
USGS Coordinates in Google Maps

Tributaries of the Raritan River
Rivers of New Jersey
Rivers of Middlesex County, New Jersey
Watchung Mountains